Dio vede e provvede is an Italian television series.

Cast

Angela Finocchiaro: Suor Amelia
Maria Amelia Monti: Suor Teresa
Athina Cenci: Madre Superiora
Antonio Catania: "il Principe"
Nathalie Guetta: Suor Letizia
Billie Zöckler: Suor Orsola
Cecilia Dazzi: Suor Luminosa
Evelina Gori: Suor Gemma
Giovanna Rotellini: Suor Delfina
Nadia Rinaldi: Suor Apollonia
Nicoletta Boris: Suor Pia
Dario Vergassola: Erminio
Remo Girone: Don Caracciolo
Zuleika Dos Santos: Suor Tikonokono
Carlo Croccolo: Gaetano
Luca Zingaretti: Italo

See also
List of Italian television series

External links
 

Italian television series
Italia 1 original programming